Ali ibn Abi Talib took part in all the battles of the Islamic prophet Muhammad's time, except the Expedition of Tabuk, as standard bearer. He also led parties of warriors on raids into enemy lands, and was an ambassador. Ali's fame grew with every battle that he was in, due to his courage, valour, and chivalry, as well as the fact that he single-handedly, destroyed many of Arabia's most famous and feared warriors. Muhammad acknowledged him as the greatest warrior of all time.

The Battle of Badr 624 A.D

Scouting
Prophet Muhammad did not know that an army had left Mecca, was marching toward Medina to protect the caravan of the Quraysh, and to challenge the Muslims. When Muhammad arrived in the environs of Badr, he sent Ali to reconnoiter the surrounding country. At the wells of Badr, Ali surprised some water-carriers. In reply to his questions, they told him that they were carrying water for an army which came from Makkah, and which was encamped on the other side of the nearby hills.

Ali brought the water-carriers before Muhammad. From them he learned that the caravan of the Quraysh had already escaped, and that the Muslims, at that very moment, were confronted by the army of Mecca.

On reaching the neighbourhood of Badr, Muhammad sent forward Ali, with a few others, to reconnoiter the rising ground above the springs. There they surprised three water-carriers of the enemy, as they were about to fill their sheepskins. One escaped to the Quraysh; the other two were captured and taken to the Muslim  army. From them Muhammad discovered the proximity of his enemy. There were 950 men; more than threefold the number of the Moslem army. They were mounted on 700 camels and 100 horses, the horsemen all clad in mail. (Sir William Muir, The Life of Mohammed, London, 1877)

Battle
The battle began in the traditional Arab fashion of having a few warriors fight one-on-one before the general battle. Three warriors from the polytheists' army-Utbah ibn Rabia, Shaiba ibn Rabia, and Walid ibn Utbah-stepped up to challenge the Muslims. Their challenges were taken up by Hamza ibn Abdul Muttalib (the uncle of Muhammad and Ali), Ubaydah ibn al-Harith (a cousin of Muhammad and Ali), and Ali ibn Abi Talib.

Ali's duel against Walid ibn Utba, one of Mecca's fiercest warriors, was the first of the three one-on-one duels. After a few blows were exchanged, Walid was killed. Hamza then engaged Shaybah ibn Rab'iah and cut him down. Ubayda ibn Harith, the third Muslim champion, however, received a fatal wound from Utbah ibn Rab'iah. Ali and Hamza hastily dispatched Ut'bah ibn Rab'iah, carrying Ubaida to die in the Muslim lines.

By noon the battle was over. The Quraysh fled. Seventy of the enemy had fallen and Ali had killed thirty-five,champions and commanders of enemy alone. Tabari in his book Tarik al Tabari mentioned all the 36 commanders by their name who were killed by Ali ibn Abi  Talib in this battle. An equal number was captured. The believers had lost fourteen men on the field of battle.<ref>Tor Andre, Mohammed, the Man and his Faith, 1960</ref>

Ali first distinguished himself as a warrior in 624, at the Battle of Badr. He defeated the Umayyad champion Walid ibn Utba as well as many other Meccan soldiers. His art of battle was so brilliant that in the battle, there were 70 Polytheist (Mushrikeen), 35 of them (more than half of them) were killed by Ali.

 Ashraf (2005), p. 36
 Merrick (2005), p. 247
  Al Seerah of Ibn Hisham narrates he killed 20 people; Abdul Malik Ibn Husham, Al Seerah Al Nabaweyah (Biography of the Prophet), Published by Mustafa Al Babi Al Halabi, Egypt, 1955 A.D, Part 2 page. 708-713
 Al Maghazi put the number at 22; aghedi, Al Maghazi (The Invasions) published by Oxford Printing. Part 1 page. 152
</ref>

The Battle of Uhud

.....One year after the battle of Badr, the new army of the idolaters of Mecca was ready to take the field against the Muslims. In March 625 AD, Abu Sufyan left Mecca at the head of three thousand seasoned warriors. Most of them were foot soldiers but they were supported by a strong contingent of cavalry. Also accompanying the army, was a band of warlike women. Their duty was to wage "psychological warfare" against the Muslims by reading poetry and by singing amatory songs to spur the courage and the will-to-fight of the soldiers. They knew that nothing held such terror for the Arabs as the jibes of women for cowardice, and they also knew that nothing was so efficacious to turn them into utterly reckless fighters as the promise of physical love. These amazons included the wives of Abu Sufyan and Amr bin Aas, and the sister of Khalid bin Walid.

Killing the Pagans Standard Bearers

The Meccans, generously assisted by the women who had brought their timbrels, flung insults at the Muslims. These were alternated by Hind, the wife of Abu Sufyan, who led triumphant choruses as she danced round the idol which perched on the camel.

Talha, the hereditary standard-bearer of the Koreishites, was the first Meccan challenger. As he stepped out of Abu Sufyan's ranks, Ali stepped out of Muhammad's. The two men met in the middle of 'no man's land.' Without words or preliminary flourishes the duel began. Talha never stood a chance. Ali's scimitar flashed in the morning sun and the head of the standard-bearer leaped from his shoulder and rolled away on the sand.

'Allahu Akbar!'(Allah is the greatest) echoed from the eagerly watching Muslims. (R. V. C. Bodley, The Messenger, the Life of Mohammed, New York, 1946) 

 When Ali ibn Abu Talib killed the carrier of the Meccan flag, Talhah ibn Abu Talha, it was immediately raised again by Uthman ibn Abu Talha. And when Uthman fell at the hands of Hamzah, it was raised again by Abu Sa'd ibn Abu Talhah. At the moment he raised the Meccan flag he shouted at the Muslims. "Do you pretend that your martyrs are in paradise and ours in hell? By God, you lie! If anyone of you truly believes such a story, let him come forward and fight with me." His challenge attracted Ali who killed him on the spot. The Banu Abd al Dar kept on carrying the Meccan flag until they lost nine men.  (Muhammad Husayn Haykal, The Life of Muhammad) 

Ali alone had killed eight standard-bearers of the idolaters of Mecca.

Ibn Athir, the Arab historian, writes in his Tarikh Kamil "The man who killed the standard-bearers (of the pagans) was Ali.The General Offensive

Ali ibn Abu Talib pressed on undismayed into the enemy ranks – it was Badr again; the Muslims were invincible.  (Sir John Glubb, The Great Arab Conquests, 1963)

Ali and Hamza had broken the ranks of the Quraysh, and he was already deep inside their lines. Unable to resist his attack, they began to yield ground. Between them, they were grinding back the army of Quraysh.

The Flight of the Muslims

The death of the bearers of the banner heightened the morale of the Muslims, who pursued the enemy headlong. This however resulted in complacency, with some of the Muslim soldiers beginning to claim war spoils for themselves whilst the battle had not yet been fully won. This allowed the pagans to launch a counter-attack, which dismayed the Muslim army and sent it into headlong retreat. Muhammad remained stranded, with only a few soldiers left to defend him against the attacks of Khalid ibn Waleed. It is recorded that 'Ali alone remained, fending off the assaults of Khaleed's cavalrymen. According to Ibn Atheer, "The Prophet became the object of the attack of various units of the army of Quraish from all sides. Ali attacked, in compliance with Muhammad's orders, every unit that made an attack upon him and dispersed them or killed some of them, and this thing took place a number of times in Uhud."...when somebody raised the cry that Muhammad was killed, chaos reigned supreme, Muslim morale plunged to the bottom and Muslim soldiers fought sporadically and purposelessly. This chaos was responsible for their killing of Husayl ibn Jabir Abu Hudhayfah by mistake, as everyone sought to save his own skin by taking flight except such men as Ali ibn Abu Talib whom God had guided and protected. (Muhammad Husayn Haykal, The Life of Muhammad, 1935, Cairo)

The first of the Qurash to reach the Prophet's position was Ikrimah. As Ikrimah led a group of his men forward the Prophet turned to Ali and, pointing at the group, said, "Attack those men." Ali attacked and drove them back, killing one of them. Now another group of horsemen approached the position. Again the Prophet said to Ali, "Attack those men." 1 Ali drove them back and killed another infidel.
A regiment arrived from Kinanah in which four of the children of Sufyan Ibn Oweif were present. Khalid, Abu AI-Sha-atha, Abu Al-Hamra, and Ghurab. The Messenger of God said to Ali: "Take care of this regiment." Ali charged the regiment, and it was about fifty horsemen. He fought them while he was on foot until he scattered them. They gathered again and he charged them again. This was repeated several times until he killed the four children of Sufyan and added to them six more ... (Ibn Abu Al Hadeed, in his Commentary, vol 1 p 372)

It was said that during 'Ali's defence of Muhammad, a call was heard, as follows: "There is no soldier but Ali, and there is no sword but Zulfiqar."

The Battle of the Trench

This battle is also known as the battle of the trench. Ali ibn Abi Talib fought alongside Muhammad.
After the battle of Uhud, Abu Sufyan and the other pagan leaders realized that they had fought an indecisive action, and that their victory had not borne any fruits for them. Islam had, in fact, resiled from its reverse at Uhud, and within an astonishingly short time, had reestablished its authority in Medina and the surrounding areas. Again Ali proved to be an invincible warrior by killing Amr ibn Abd al-Wud who was one of the most feared warriors at the time. After Ali dropped Amr ibn wod al ameree off his horse, Amr spat at Ali. Ali got angry, and so he walked away for a moment and then got back after he calmed down, he told Amr ibn wod al ameree "If I had killed you before then I would have satisfied myself and not God's will."and then he killed Amr. The Muslim ranks roared and were happy.

The Battle of Khaybar

The campaign of Khaybar was one of the greatest. The masses of Jews living in Khaybar were the strongest, the richest, and the best equipped for war of all the peoples of Arabia. Even though they were rich and lived in castles Muhammed and Ali still had respect for them in Khaybar. Imam Ali suffered from an eye illness and was not in battle-ready condition. Although he was ill, Muhammed called him and he came to his service. According to Islamic historians, Muhammed cured Ali's illness by rubbing his saliva on Ali's eyes. According to this tradition, Ali killed a Jewish chieftain with a sword-stroke, which split the helmet into two pieces, the head and the body of the victim. Having lost his shield, Ali is said to have lifted both of the doors of the fortress from its hinges, climbed into the moat and held them up to make a bridge whereby the attackers gained access to the redoubt. This story is one basis for the Muslim view, especially in Shi'a Islam, of Ali as the prototype of heroes.

The other expeditions
Ali also participated in the Expedition of Fidak. Muhammad sent Ali to attack the Bani Sa‘d bin Bakr tribe, because Muhammad received intelligence they were planning to help the Jews of Khaybar

He also led the Expedition of Ali ibn Abi Talib as a commander in July 630. Muhammad sent him to destroy al-Qullus, an idol worshipped by pagans

Caliphate era

Battle of Jamal

The Battle of Jamal, sometimes called the Battle of the Camel or the Battle of Bassorah, took place at Basra, Iraq on 7 November 656.  A'isha heard about the killing of Uthman (644-656), the third Caliph. At the time she was on a pilgrimage to Mecca. It was on this journey that she became so angered by his unavenged death, and the naming of Ali as the fourth caliph, that she took up arms against those supporting Ali. She gained support of the big city of Basra and, for the first time, Muslims took up arms against each other. This battle is now known as the First Fitna, or Muslim civil war.

Battle of Siffin

The Battle of Siffin (May–July 657 CE) occurred during the First Fitna, or first Muslim civil war, with the main engagement taking place from July 26 to July 28. It was fought between Ali ibn Abi Talib and Muawiyah I, on the banks of the Euphrates river, in what is now Raqqa, Syria.

The two armies encamped themselves at Siffin for more than one hundred days, most of the time being spent in negotiations. Neither side wanted to fight. Then on 11th Safar 37 AH, the Iraqis under Ashtar's command, the Qurra, in Ali's army, who had their own camp started the fighting in earnest which lasted three days. Historian Yaqubi wrote that Ali had 80,000 men, including 70 Companions who participated in the Battle of Badr, 70 Companions who took oath at Hudaibia, and 400 prominent Ansars and Muhajirun; while Muawiya had 120,000 Syrians. 
The battle of siffin was one of the bloodiest battles in the Islamic history, all of the bravest warriors of Arabia participated in the battle both from Iraq and Syria. the fighting usually began in the morning and continued till evening. at first Ali  didn't want a general war because he had all the hope of convincing Muawiya to put down his rebellion. The first 3 month's both camps where in full negotiations with each other, the fighting was very limited and each day a commander of Ali's army came out with a battalion and from the other side there was the same respond. After 3 months of negotiations Ali realised that its all in vain and prepared for a general war. the night before the battle the soldiers spent their night sharpening their swords, spears and arrows. By this announcement Muawiya became worried because he knew the bravery of Ali and his swordsmanship skills. Muawiya also did the same and prepared his troops for a bloody battle. Early in the morning Ali set his troops in formation, he gave the command of the left flank to his best general Malik al-ashtar who was renown for his bravery and fighting skills, over the right flank he gave the command to his courageous cousin named Abdullah ibn Abbas, Ali himself took position in the centre of the army. By the time both armies stood in front of each other, Ali gave the order for a full attack, the fight was so fierce that even the bravest warriors perished. by midday the right flank of Ali's army began to fall en the men began to flee, when Ali saw his right flank is falling he himself moved to the right flank and faced the onslaught of the enemy who were great in numbers, Ali drove the enemy back because of his great valor and fighting skills, he slaughtered every soldiers who came in his way, when the men saw their flank is reorganized by Ali himself they came back to the battlefield for a new attack. When Ali saw his right flank back in formation he returned to the centre and made an attack with the men from the centre and his personal bodyguard elite, The attack was so fierce that the whole Syrian army where pushed back. Ali himself fought with such a valor that even the great Syrian warriors got frightened of him when they heard that Ali is coming for an attack. the battle of that day was so fierce that it continued to the night. by the time Ali and his army had pushed the Syrians 500 meters back from the battleground and victory became in sight. it is said that every man Ali killed he called out " god is great " and when it was counted it came on 534 confirmed kills which is a record in history of war.

William Muir wrote that, "Both armies drawn out in entire array, fought till the shades of evening fell, neither having got the better. The following morning, the combat was renewed with great vigour. Ali posed himself in the centre with the flower of his troops from Medina, and the wings were formed, one of the warriors from Basra, the other of those from Kufa. Muawiya had a pavilion pitched on the field; and there, surrounded by five lines of his sworn body-guards, watched the day. Amr with a great weight of horse, bore down upon the Kufa wing which gave away; and Ali was exposed to imminent peril, both from thick showers of arrows and from close encounter ... Ali's general Ashtar, at the head of 300 Hafiz-e-Qur'an(those who had memorized the Koran) led forward the other wing, which fell with fury on Muawiya's body-guards. Four of its five ranks were cut to pieces, and Muawiya, bethinking himself of flight, had already called for his horse, when a martial couplet flashed in his mind, and he held his ground."

Battle of Nahrawan

The Battle of Nahrawan was a battle between Ali ibn Abi Talib (the first Shi'ah Imam and the fourth Sunni Caliph) and the Kharijites, near Nahrawan, twelve miles from Baghdad.

See also
Military career of Muhammed
Abu Dujana

Footnotes

ReferencesEncyclopaedia of Islam. Ed. P. Bearman et al., Leiden: Brill, 1960-2005.
Jafri, S.H.M. The Origins and Early Development of Shi'a Islam.''  Longman;1979 
 
 (In Arabic)
 

Ali
Ali